The ICC Academy Ground is a cricket ground located in Dubai Sports City, Dubai. ICC Academy provides indoor and outdoor pitches. ICC was used for the 2014 ICC Under-19 Cricket World Cup. The two cricket grounds are installed with floodlights.
The venue hosted warm-up matches ahead of the 2021 ICC Men's T20  World Cup.

Trivia
In 2014, a match between Ireland and Scotland in Dubai Triangular Series 2014–15 was called off. This was the first time that an ODI in the UAE had been a no result. In September 2019, both grounds were named as two of the venues to host cricket matches for the 2019 ICC T20 World Cup Qualifier tournament.

International record

ICC Academy Ground 1

One Day International centuries
Following ODI centuries that have been scored at the venue.

One Day International five-wicket hauls
The following table summarizes the five-wicket hauls taken in ODIs at this venue.

Twenty20 International centuries
One T20I century has been scored at the venue.

Twenty20 International five-wicket hauls
The following table summarizes the five-wicket hauls taken in T20Is at this venue.

ICC Academy Ground 2

Women's Twenty20 International five-wicket hauls
The following table summarizes the five-wicket hauls taken in WT20Is at this venue.

See also

International Cricket Council
Dubai Sports City
ICC Academy

References

Global
Cricket academies
Cricket in the United Arab Emirates
Sports venues in Dubai
Multi-purpose stadiums in the United Arab Emirates
Dubai Sports City
Sports venues completed in 2009
2009 establishments in the United Arab Emirates